SeinLanguage is a 1993 book written by Jerry Seinfeld.
SeinLanguage was critically acclaimed and scored a spot on the New York Times Best Seller list. The title is a play on words, taking advantage of how the first four letters of "Seinfeld" are a homonym of "sign" (as in sign language).

Contents 

 Introduction
 Freeway of Love
 Jokes about dating, sex, and relationships
 Personal Maintenance
 Jokes about health and physical appearance
 Paldom
 Jokes about friendship and phone calls
 Shut Up and Drive
 Jokes about driving and air travel
 Job Security
 Jokes about office life and various vocations
 The Thing Is the Thing
 Jokes about money, crime, and television
 Out and Back
 Jokes about sports, going out, and apartments
 The Ride of Your Life
 Jokes about childhood, parents, and old age

References

1993 non-fiction books
Comedy books
Autobiographies